Fernando Martín Carreras (born 27 August 1981 in Valencia) is a Spanish footballer who plays for Paterna CF as a central defender.

External links

1981 births
Living people
Footballers from Valencia (city)
Spanish footballers
Association football defenders
Segunda División players
Segunda División B players
Tercera División players
CD Eldense footballers
Benidorm CF footballers
Cultural Leonesa footballers
CD Alcoyano footballers
FC Cartagena footballers
Ontinyent CF players